Jamie Lou Stenzel (born 15 May 2002), known by her stage name Au/Ra, is an Antiguan-German singer-songwriter. Stenzel released her first single "Concrete Jungle" in 2016, which quickly gained 15 million streams worldwide. She rose to prominence in 2018 with the CamelPhat version of the single "Panic Room" that she wrote about mental health problems, and was featured on Norwegian-Britsh DJ Alan Walker's number-one single "Darkside" in the same year. Her original version of Panic Room without Camelphat's remix, has over 100 million streams worldwide. Jamie was born in Ibiza, where she grew up until 2007, but since then she has been raised in St. John's, Antigua by a musical family; her father being German producer Torsten Stenzel.

Stage name origin 
Au/Ra's stage name consists of two elements from the periodic table: "Au" stands for gold, while "Ra" stands for radium. According to Alan Walker's Unmasked Vlog #1 Video on YouTube, Jamie stated that there are already a couple of artists with the first name of 'Aura', and when she chose 'Aura' as her stage name, she decided to put a slash between 'Au' and 'Ra'. She also mentioned that her artist name derives from a The Lord of the Rings fan-fiction she read when she was younger, where the main character was called Aura.

Discography

Extended plays

Singles

As lead artist

As featured artist

Guest appearances

Awards and nominations

Results

Notes

References

External links 
Au/Ra's artist page on Sony Music UK website

2002 births
Living people
People from Ibiza
Antigua and Barbuda musicians
English women pop singers
English people of German descent
Columbia Records artists
21st-century English women singers
21st-century English singers